The following are lists of changes to American television networks, including changes of station affiliations, that occurred in 2018.

Networks and services

Network launches

Network conversions and rebrandings

Network closures

Television stations

Station launches
	
	
Notes

Stations changing network affiliation

Major affiliation changes 

 This section outlines affiliation changes involving English and Spanish language networks (ABC, NBC, CBS, Fox, PBS, The CW, Univision, etc.), and format conversions involving independent stations. Digital subchannels will only be mentioned if the prior or new affiliation involves a major English and Spanish broadcast network or a locally programmed independent entertainment format.

Subchannel affiliations

Station spectrum transitions

Station closures

See also
 2018 in American television
 2018 deaths in American television

References

2018 in American television
American television network changes